Antonio Capuano (born 9 April 1940) is an Italian film director and screenwriter. 

After a long apprenticeship in television as a set designer (working on, amongst other things, the television series Sheridan, squadra omicidi), Capuano debuted in the world of cinema in 1991 with the feature film Vito e gli altri, a film about the difficult life of street children in Naples, winner of the eighth Settimana Internazionale della Critica at the Venice Film Festival.  Success came in 1996 with the film Pianese Nunzio, 14 anni a maggio, which tells the story of a young altar boy abused by his parish priest.

Thereafter he directed other films such as Polvere di Napoli (1998) and Luna Rossa (2001), which won a golden lion nomination at the 58th Venice Film Festival.  Another success was La guerra di Mario (2005), for which Capuano won the critics prize at the David di Donatello in 2006.  He also directed segments in the collective films L'unico paese al mondo (1994) and I vesuviani (1997), and then Giallo? and L'amore buio.

Ciro Capano portrays a semi-fictionalized version of Capuano in Paolo Sorrentino's 2021 film The Hand of God.

Selected filmography
 Vito and the Others (1991)
 Sacred Silence (1996)
 The Dust of Naples (1998)
 Red Moon (2001)
 Mario's War (2005)
 Dark Love (2010)

References

External links

1940 births
Living people
Italian film directors
Italian screenwriters
Film people from Naples
Nastro d'Argento winners
Italian male screenwriters